Vaux-devant-Damloup (literally Vaux before Damloup) is a former commune in the Meuse department in Grand Est in north-eastern France. It had a population of 76 (2019). On 1 January 2019, it was merged into the new commune Douaumont-Vaux.

Fort Vaux is partially located within the territory of the commune (the other part is in Damloup).

It was one of the French villages destroyed during World War I. The new village was rebuilt near the old village. The old village is now a memorial.

See also
 Zone rouge (First World War)
 List of French villages destroyed in World War I
 Communes of the Meuse department

References

Vauxdevantdamloup